Arthabaska is a provincial electoral district in the Centre-du-Québec region of Quebec, Canada that elects members to the National Assembly of Quebec.  It notably includes municipalities of Victoriaville, Plessisville, Princeville and Saint-Christophe-d'Arthabaska.

It was created for the 1890 election from a part of Drummond-Arthabaska electoral district.

In the change from the 2001 to the 2011 electoral map, Arthabaska lost Sainte-Hélène-de-Chester and Chesterville to the newly created Drummond–Bois-Francs electoral district, but gained nine municipalities from Lotbinière, which ceased to exist.

Members of the Legislative Assembly / National Assembly

Election results

^ Change is from redistributed results; CAQ gain from ADQ

References

External links
Information
 Elections Quebec

Election results
 Election results (National Assembly)

Maps
 2011 map (PDF)
 2001 map (Flash)
2001–2011 changes (Flash)
1992–2001 changes (Flash)
 Electoral map of Centre-du-Québec region
 Quebec electoral map, 2011

Quebec provincial electoral districts
Arthabaska Regional County Municipality